Cherelle and Cherrelle is a female given name. Notable people with the name include:

 Cherelle Khassal (born 1991), Irish footballer
 Cherelle Parker (born 1973), Democratic politician
 Cherelle Thompson (born 1992), Trinidad and Tobago swimmer
 Cherrelle (born 1958), American singer
 Cherrelle Fennell (born 1986), British female artistic gymnast
 Cherrelle Garrett (born 1989), American bobsledder